Récourt is a commune in the Pas-de-Calais department in the Hauts-de-France region of France.

Geography

Population
The inhabitants are called Récourtois.

Places of interest
 The church of Notre-Dame, dating from the seventeenth century.

See also
 Communes of the Pas-de-Calais department

References

Communes of Pas-de-Calais